San José de Aerocuar is a town in the state of Sucre, Venezuela. It is the capital of the Andrés Mata Municipality.

Populated places in Sucre (state)